The Kraków Barbican is a barbican – a fortified outpost once connected to the city walls. It is a historic gateway leading into the Old Town of Kraków, Poland. The barbican is one of the few remaining relics of the complex network of fortifications and defensive barriers that once encircled the royal city of Kraków in the south of Poland. It currently serves as a tourist attraction and venue for a variety of exhibitions.

Today the Barbican is under the jurisdiction of The Historical Museum of the City of Kraków. Tourists may tour its interior with its displays outlining the historical development of fortifications in Kraków.

History 
The Gothic-style barbican, built around 1498, is one of only three such fortified outposts still surviving in Europe, and the best preserved. It is a moated cylindrical brick structure with an inner courtyard 24.4 meters in diameter, and seven turrets. Its 3-meter-thick walls hold 130 embrasures. The barbican was originally linked to the city walls by a covered passageway that led through St. Florian's Gate and served as a checkpoint for all who entered the city.

The Poles built the barbican fearing an attack by the Ottoman Empire after the defeat of King John I Albert at the Battle of the Cosmin Forest.

The Barbican participated in the defense of Kraków in 1587 against the Siege of Kraków (1587) by Maximilian III, Archduke of Austria, in the Siege of Kraków (1655) and the Siege of Kraków (1657), and Russian troops during the Polish–Russian War of 1792.

The building was threatened with demolition early in the 19th Century. However, in 1817 two senators of the Free City of Kraków, Feliks Radwanski and Jan Librowski, convinced the Senate to preserve the Barbican and other parts of the old fortifications.

Design
It was built of brick and stone and stood four stories tall. It had seven watch towers.

Features 
Considered a masterpiece of medieval military engineering, the circular fortress of the Kraków's Barbakan was added to the city's fortifications along the coronation route in the late 15th century, based on Arabic rather than European defensive strategy. On its eastern wall, a tablet commemorates the feat of a Kraków burgher, Marcin Oracewicz, who, during the Bar Confederation, defended the town against the Russians and shot their Colonel Panin, according to a legend, using a czamara button instead of a bullet.

Gallery

See also 
 Planty Park, which encircles Kraków's Old Town (Stare Miasto)
 Warsaw Barbican

Notes

Bibliography 
 Marek Żukow-Karczewski, The Barbican (Barbakan), "KRAKÓW" Magazyn Kulturalny, Special Edition (English-language version), "KRAKÓW" Magazine, Kraków, 1991, p. 58-59.

External links 

 How to get there?
 Kraków Poland: information about and photographs of Kraków's Barbican

Buildings and structures completed in 1498
Barbican
Barbicans
Tourist attractions in Kraków